The Schwarzberg (also known as Piz Nair) (2,764 m) is a mountain of the Lepontine Alps, located on the border between the Swiss cantons of Uri and Graubünden. It lies between the valleys of Unteralp (west) and Maighels (east).

References

External links
 Schwarzberg on Hikr

Mountains of the Alps
Mountains of Graubünden
Mountains of the canton of Uri
Graubünden–Uri border
Lepontine Alps
Mountains of Switzerland
Two-thousanders of Switzerland